Namazi Hospital is a hospital in Namazi Square, Shiraz, Iran. It was founded by Mohammad Namazi in 1950.
Mohammad Namazi founded this hospital with 22 residential villas for physicians in 1950. It was later extended in 1975 and a polyclinic building, a six-storey parking and some affiliated buildings were constructed. The admission capacity of the hospital rose from 200 to 750 beds. The first liver transplant was performed in 1993 in Shiraz University Hospital (Namazi). The first living-related kidney transplantation performed at Shiraz University Hospital dates back to 1968. The hospital has an active oncology department publishing papers regularly.

References

External links
 namazi hospital website
 http://www.nature.com/ki/journal/v82/n6/full/ki2012219a.html

Hospital buildings completed in 1950
Hospitals in Iran
Hospitals established in 1950
Buildings and structures in Shiraz
1950 establishments in Iran
Hospitals in Shiraz